Johann Friedrich Mayer (6 December 1650 – 30 March 1712) was a German Lutheran theologian and professor of theology at Wittenberg University.
He was an important champion of Lutheran orthodoxy and General Superintendent of Swedish Pomerania.

Life
Johann Friedrich Mayer was born in Leipzig on 6 December 1650 as the son of Johann Ulrich Mayer and his wife Ursula Sophia Braun. He attended the University of Leipzig and was awarded a bachelor's degree on 21 April 1666. A master's degree in liberal arts from the Faculty of Philosophy Faculty followed on 30 January 1668. He then attended the University of Strasbourg, where he applied himself to theological studies under Balthasar Friedrich Salzmann and  until 1670.

On 13 February 1671, he joined the Theological Faculty of Leipzig University. On 29 January 1672, he was made Saturday preacher (assistant pastor) in Leipzig, and later that year he was appointed superintendent in Leisnig. On 29 May 1673 he obtained his licentiate and on 19 October 1674 his doctorate in Theology. On 27 November 1678, he was appointed pastor and superintendent in Grimma.

However, he did not find the position in Grimma fulfilling and wished to pursue an academic career. During his work as pastor, Mayer had made a name for himself as a writer of pamphlets against Syncretists, Arminianists and Papists.

By decision of the Saxon High Consistory in Dresden, he was appointed fourth professor of theology at the University of Wittenberg on 12 May 1684, where he worked alongside Abraham Calovius, Johannes Andreas Quenstedt, and Johann Deutschmann. This post entailed serving as second preacher at the Wittenberg Castle Church and administering the state scholarships. In his inaugural address he argued, with reference to Philipp Spener's , that theology should pursue piety rather than engaging in speculation.

Mayer was rector of Wittenberg University in the winter semester of 1684. The scandal of the breakdown of his marriage, ending in divorce, which was rare at that time, impaired Mayer's effectiveness in Wittenberg, and he accepted the position of senior pastor of St. James' Church, Hamburg, though he would have preferred to remain in Wittenberg. Spener had admonished Mayer in connection with his marital problems and prevented him from obtaining positions that became available in Wittenberg, which led to a deep and lasting rift between Mayer and Spener. As a champion of Lutheran orthodoxy, Mayer later became one of Spener's most troublesome opponents.

In 1692–93 there was a serious controversy among the senior pastors in Hamburg concerning the admissibility of Pietist conventicles. Mayer prevailed and Horb was removed from his post; after Mayer's departure, however, Winckler, who had formerly acted as mediator, became the senior minister in Hamburg.

During his time in Hamburg, Mayer conducted a lively correspondence with leading figures of his time. In addition, in 1691 King Charles XI of Sweden made him Senior Church Councillor of the German territory under Swedish rule. In 1698 he was Consistorial Councillor to Anna Dorothea, Abbess of Quedlinburg and was also involved in theological affairs in Berlin.

In Hamburg Mayer had advanced to the status of an important champion of Lutheran orthodoxy.
By virtue of this office he was professor of the Theological Faculty of the University of Greifswald, pastor and senior city minister at the collegiate church of St. Nicholas, assistant chancellor of the university, and chairman of the Greifswald Consistory. Aided by his already voluminous library and art collection, Mayer developed extensive activity as an author in Greifswald.

Mayer played an active role in the organizational work at the university and was its rector in 1701 and 1705.

He concerned himself with the history of Pomerania and intended to establish a learned society. However, the events of the Great Northern War intervened. Despite his loyalty to his Swedish master, after the entry of the enemy army on 25 January 1712, he was supposed to hold a prayer service for Peter the Great and Augustus II the Strong in St. Nicholas's church, where he was supposed to pray for the permanent expulsion of his Swedish employer. This caused him such agitation that he suffered a stroke. Because of this he resigned all his offices and went to Stettin, where he died of a further stroke.

On 29 May 1673 J. F. Mayer married Catharina Sabina Welsch, the daughter of Gottfried Welsch, a Leipzig Professor of Medicine. His son Johann Abraham Mayer later became a Professor of Medicine in Greifswald. The marriage was dissolved in 1686.

Johann Friedrich Mayer died 30 March 1712 in Stettin.

Importance
As a strictly orthodox Lutheran, Mayer brooked no deviations from prescribed beliefs and, even during this period of late Orthodoxy, insisted on the sole validity of Lutheran orthodoxy. He did not realize that this obduracy deprived orthodoxy of its legitimation. It was this rigid attitude that enabled the currents of Rationalism and early Enlightenment to develop, which could not have been his intention.

Book and Art Collections
Mayer built up a large book and art collection. He had one of the largest private libraries of the early 18th century. His art collection included a synagogue scene, a large collection of medals and a large number of pictures, including Cranach's portraits of the Protestant Reformers of Wittenberg.
In 1694, Mayer was given an eight-voice residence organ by the organ builder Arp Schnitger, and he took this with him when he moved to Greifswald.
After his death, his library was sold at auction. Most of the pictures remained in the family's possession until they were auctioned at the end of the 18th century. A copy of a Rubens painting from Mayer's collection now hangs in the church of Neuenkirchen.
In 1742, the organ was installed in the Gutskapelle Deyersdorf; the box and two original registers by Arp Schnitger are still intact.

Writings

Independent works (selection)
Mayer had 281 printed works published, so only a selection is given here.
 Museum ministri ecclesiae
 L. de electione Pontificis Rom. Hamburg, 1700
 Historia versionis Germanicae Bibiorum Lutheri
 Historia synodorum Gryphiswaldensium
 De side Baronii & Bellarmini ipsis Pontificiis ambigua
 Ecclesia Papaia Luterane patrona & cliens
 Biblotheca Biblica, Greifswald, 1702
 Chrysostomus Lutheranus, Wittenberg, 1686
 Ves und wiedergefundenes Kind Gottes
 Hamburgischer Sabbath
 Hamburgisches Ninive
 Biblotheca scriptorum Theologiae moralis, published with Strauchen's Theologiae morali, Greifswald, 1705
 Eclogae evangelicae
 Erste Früchte der Beredsamkeit
 Würdiger Communicant
 Warnung für einen falschen Eyd
 Betendes Kind Gottes
 Buß und Gebetsprüche
 Evangelischer Engel
 Wiederholung der heiligen Sabbathsarbeit
 Gottgeheiligte Früh-Stunden; 1706, Leipzig, published by Nicolaus Thürmann
 Lanx satura lucubrationum philologicarum, Strasbourg, 1669
 Bild Königs Karl XII, Greifswald, 1708

Letters
 Greifswaldisches Wochen-Blatt. 1744. (Copies of extracts from Mayer's correspondence)
 Handschriftliche Briefe Mayers an Johann Albrecht Fabricius. In: Staats- und Universitätsbibliothek Hamburg. Nachlass Reimarus M. 7-55.
 Handschriftliche Briefe Mayers an G. Spizel. In: Staatsbibliothek Augsburg.

Others
 Johann Carl Dähnert: "Pommersche Bibliothek". Vol. 2, Greifswald 1753, S. 405–424, 445–459, 525–535 Bd. 3, Greifswald 1754. pp. 41–58, 83–93.
 Kurt Detlev Möller: Johann Albrecht Fabricius 1668–1736. In: Zeitschrift des Vereins für Hamburgische Geschichte Jg. 36 (1937) pp. 1–64, here especially p. 43.

References

Bibliography

 
 
 
 
 

The following are cited indirectly via the German Wikipedia article (q.v.). The translator of the English article may not have seen the original sources: 
 
 
 
 
 

 
 
 

 
 
 
 
 

 

1650 births
1712 deaths
German Lutheran theologians
17th-century German Lutheran clergy
17th-century German Protestant theologians
German male non-fiction writers
17th-century German writers
18th-century German writers
18th-century German male writers
17th-century German male writers
18th-century German Lutheran clergy
Writers from Leipzig
Clergy from Leipzig